Rufus is a fictional character in the American animated television series Kim Possible (2002–2007) and its 2019 live-action film adaptation. Voiced by actress Nancy Cartwright, Rufus is a pet naked mole-rat owned by Ron Stoppable – Kim Possible's best friend and sidekick – and first appears in the show's pilot episode "Crush", which premiered on June 7, 2002. Residing and traveling in his owner's pocket, Rufus accompanies Kim and Ron on missions to protect the world from evildoers, at times proving beneficial to their success.

Series creators Bob Schooley and Mark McCorkle created Rufus at the behest of Disney Channel executives who insisted that the animated series should feature an animal sidekick. Inspired by the naked mole-rat exhibit at the Philadelphia Zoo, the creative duo conceived the character as a naked mole-rat to trick the network into uttering the word "naked" whenever possible. The writers took several creative liberties that differentiate Rufus from real naked mole-rats, such as a longer lifespan and more palatable appearance. The character is anthropomorphic, but apart from the occasional spoken word communicates using mostly squeaks and giggles, improvised by Cartwright. After considering having the character portrayed by either a live or puppeted mole-rat in the live-action film, the filmmakers opted to make Rufus computer-animated instead, spending several months finalizing a design that was realistic yet appealing.

The character has been called a fan favorite and one of the series' most popular characters by reviewers. Cartwright was nominated for a Daytime Emmy Award for Outstanding Performer in an Animated Program for her performance. Rufus has also been named the most famous naked mole-rat by various media and scientific publications, and is credited with introducing the species into mainstream popular culture.

Role 
Rufus is the anthropomorphic pet naked mole-rat of Ron Stoppable, who is Kim Possible's best friend and sidekick. Living and traveling in Ron's pants pocket, Rufus accompanies Kim and Ron on international missions as a member Team Possible, during which his actions sometimes jeopardize their missions. However, Rufus has proven both intelligent and capable for a mole-rat, helping his teammates whenever possible and proving adept at overcoming electronic and mechanical obstacles; he typically emerges from Ron's pocket to either offer assistance or eat food. Rufus also shares a strong affinity for nachos with Ron, and is considered to be his owner's best friend, apart from Kim. Josh Weiss of Syfy Wire observed that the character is "capable of infectious energy and non-verbal comedy all the same", despite communicating mostly via squeaks and grunts. 

Rufus is one of the show's primary sources of comic relief, alongside Ron. As revealed in "The Naked Mole Rap", a song written about Rufus, Ron obtains Rufus because his father is allergic to all animal furs, leading him to settle for a hairless pet and ultimately discover Rufus on the Internet.

Development

Creation and voice 

Writers Bob Schooley and Mark McCorkle conceived Kim Possible as an animated television series about a teenage girl who can seemingly do anything, and her best friend who struggles to do the same, into which Rufus was incorporated once the show's "basic foundation" was written. Rufus was conceived at the behest of Disney Channel executives, who insisted that all children's animated series could benefit from at least one animal sidekick. The addition of a pet character was among the earliest notes the creators received from the network. Although Schooley and McCorkle did not mind the note themselves, some staff writers were dismissive towards the suggestion.

Deciding the show's resident pet should be as unique as possible, Schooley was inspired by his children's fascination with the naked mole-rat exhibit at the Philadelphia Zoo, describing the animals as "ugly, gross, but somehow still cute creatures". Already weary of constant network edits and suggestions, the creators allegedly tricked the executives by conceiving Rufus as a naked mole-rat, which in turn forces everyone to say the word "naked" whenever the character's species is mentioned throughout the children's program. The reason for the character's existence being that Ron's father is allergic to animal fur was not conceived until much after Rufus' introduction into the show. Despite the character's eventual popularity, the writers maintained using him sparingly throughout the series, in which he is "only peppered in there occasionally" apart from occasional brief gag-orientated episodes focusing on the character.

Rufus is voiced by American actress Nancy Cartwright, following a common trend in which animated male characters are voiced by women. Cartwright's dialogue for Rufus consists of almost entirely squeaks, gurgles and giggles, believing that the character offers comedy and "a little levity to the show." However, the character occasionally utters words and phrases considered to be Kim Possible hallmarks, such as "boo-yah". Cartwright researched naked mole-rats in preparation for the role, discovering that they "are tunnel dwellers and social animals who live in large communities" who also "don’t do well out in the sunlight". Cartwright also found them to be “kind of disgusting looking", likening them to "overcooked hot dogs.” The actress typically improvised and performed the role without a written script, borrowing direction from the character's emotions during particular scenes that vary from excited to sad. Cartwright voiced Rufus while voicing Chuckie Finster from Rugrats.

Cartwright reprised her voice role in the show's 2019 live-action film adaptation, having hoped Disney would invite her back once the project was announced. Cartwright considers Rufus the film's only truly animated aspect, hoping that the character's inclusion "adds this little extra thing that inspires kids." Cartwright shared behind the scenes footage of herself voicing the character on her social media accounts. Actor Sean Giambrone, who plays Ron in the film, expressed admiration for Cartwright's "ability to bring Rufus to life with her voice", feeling that he bonded with the character despite being unable to see or interact with him while filming. Despite being best known for voicing Bart Simpson in The Simpsons, Cartwright considers voicing Rufus a highlight of her career, enjoying fans' surprised reactions when she demonstrates her Rufus impression for them: "it’s kind of surprising that I’m like five feet tall, I’ve got children of my own, I’m a grandma, and these sounds come out of this little package here. I think it’s fun for everyone”.

Design and characterization 
Rufus differs significantly from real naked mole-rats found in nature. Unlike the character, naked mole-rats are unlikely to survive if kept as pets and prone to die in captivity. Rufus' lifespan is also uncharacteristically long for a naked mole-rat. When the live-action adaptation of Kim Possible was first green-lit, the directors had considered having a live mole-rat portray Rufus, but Schooley and McCorkle determined that this would not benefit the creature itself or viewers, opting for the character to be computer-animated instead. 15 years prior, the original series had aired an episode jokingly entitled "And the Mole Rat Will Be CGI" revolving around Hollywood filmmakers and actors producing a film based on Kim's life.

Before deciding on CGI, the filmmakers had also considered depicting Rufus using puppets before ultimately determining that computer animation was "the only way to capture his expressiveness ... We really worked hard with the animators to make him feel real, because we didn’t want a Roger Rabbit situation going on where the world is live-action and then you have this cartoon character. We wanted Rufus to be part of their world and grounded, even though he is expressive, cute and fun." The visual effects studio Pixomondo was responsible for animating Rufus, a task they found challenging because, according to director Zach Lipovsky, the animals "are pretty disgusting creatures", finding it "hilarious to have one of the grossest animals be the [show and film's] comedic relief." Because the computer-animated character needed to be more realistic than his cuter, stylized traditionally animated counterpart, the Pixomondo artists worked for several months to determine a suitable "balance between cute and real".

The character's origins and his relationship with Ron are altered for the film, in which Ron discovers Rufus in a science lab. Giambrone explained, "Ron knew that that [Rufus] was like a missing part of him ... Then we get to see how they help each other out for the rest of the movie". The actors did not see Rufus's final design until the character's visual effects were completely rendered, instead looking at either Giambrone's shoulder or a figurine that they found hardly resembled Rufus while filming. Giambrone was pleased with the character's design upon seeing it for the first time, expounding, "I knew that was exactly what he should look like and it just felt like I was reunited with a buddy, seeing the movie with Rufus in it.”

Reception and impact 
The New York Times television critic Julie Salamon wrote "the cheerful presence of Rufus ... signals that ... executive producer and director, Chris Bailey, doesn't mind getting cute in obvious ways." USA Today's Alex Kane cited Rufus among the show's "charming cast" of memorable characters, while the Pittsburgh Post-Gazette's Rob Owen identified him as its breakout character. Rufus is considered by reviewers to be one of the show's most popular characters and components, establishing himself as a fan favorite. McCorkle believes Rufus is the series' most popular character among younger viewers, an observation with which Judith S. Gillies of The Washington Post agreed. Dylan Kickham of Elite Daily named Rufus both "iconic" and "Everyone's favorite naked mole-rat". Similarly, the Rockford Register Star called Rufus "our favorite naked mole-rat". Andy Swift of TVLine deemed Rufus an "iconic" character. Furthermore, Kickham believes Rufus' role in the series is "the reason why so many young adults have actually heard of naked mole-rats." Cartwright's performance earned her a Daytime Emmy Award nomination for Outstanding Performer in an Animated Program at the 31st Daytime Emmy Awards in 2004. MovieWeb's Jeremy Dick hailed Rufus as "one of Cartwright's best roles".

Fans of the series were initially outraged when the film adaptation's first trailer did not feature Rufus. Fans were eventually delighted to learn that Cartwright would be reprising her role in the film. While Blair Marnell of Nerdist opined that producers should be open to recasting the film's main characters in favor of more diverse actors, she insisted that "As long as Nancy Cartwright wants to reprise her role as the voice of Rufus, she should be able to do that for life." Reviewing the film, Polygon's Petrana Radulovic described Rufus as "just silly enough as to not be jarring." Despite being disappointed with the overall film and Rufus' comparative lack of screentime, Aydan Rossovich of The Bear River Current felt he was "The only acceptable character ... while it’s disappointing that he was barely in it, if he had been in the movie more than he was, it would have just made it even more annoying."

STEM Jobs crowned Rufus "one of the most faithful, yet smallest sidekicks of all time." Rufus has been called the most famous naked mole-rat in the world. Kristy Pirone of Screen Rant believes Rufus "will live in perpetuity as the most famous naked mole-rat of all time." Massive Science credits Rufus and Kim Possible with introducing naked mole-rats into mainstream popular culture. The Liberty Science Center observed that most people may "only know about naked mole rats via cartoon characters", such as Rufus. The Field Museum of Natural History wrote that "Rufus stole the hearts of all who watched him save the day. In many episodes, Rufus is the hero, and like Kim and Ron, scientists agree that naked mole-rats are pretty cool."

References 

Animal superheroes
Television characters introduced in 2002
Animated characters introduced in 2002
Anthropomorphic rodents
Television sidekicks
Kim Possible characters